Ventosa is a village in the province and autonomous community of La Rioja, Spain.

Politics

Notable people
 Francisco de Esquivel y Aldana
 Basilio Antonio García y Velasco

References

Municipalities in La Rioja (Spain)